The Lesotho national football team represents Lesotho in men's international football and is governed by the Lesotho Football Association. The team's nickname is "Likuena" (Crocodiles). The team has never qualified for the FIFA World Cup finals and the Africa Cup of Nations finals in history. The team represents both FIFA and Confederation of African Football (CAF).

History
The team played their first international match in 1970, a 2–1 victory against Malawi. They have not qualified for a FIFA World Cup or Africa Cup of Nations yet.

Their highest position in the FIFA World Ranking was 105th in August 2014.

Their biggest ever win was 5–0 against Swaziland in April 2006. 

From 2004 to 2006, the German Antoine Hey coached the national side. The ambitious goal was the qualification for the 2010 World Cup in neighbouring South Africa. However, after one and a half years, Hey was dismissed for failing. The successor was the Serb Zavisa Milosavljevic, who was also dismissed in September 2009 and was replaced by Lesotho native Leslie Notši, who was previously the assistant coach of the national team. In 2014 Seephephe "Mochini" Matete trained the team, a former international. Moses Maliehe became the coach in 2016.

The biggest success of the national team was reaching the final of the 2000 COSAFA Cup. In 2005 the under-20 national team qualified for the 2005 African Youth Championship. They finished third place of Group B, with a win and two losses. 

The nickname of the national team is Likuena (Sesotho for "the crocodiles").

Recent results and fixtures

2022

2023

Managers
Caretaker manager are listed in italics.

  April Phumo (1979–1995)
  Lefa Ramakau (2000–??)
  Monaheng Monyane (2003–2004)
  Antoine Hey (2004–2006)
  Motheo Mohapi (2006–2007)
  Zaviša Milosavljević (2007–2009)
  Leslie Notši (2009)
  Leslie Notši (2011–2013)
  Adam Siddorn (2013)
  Seephephe Matete (2014–2015)
  Moses Maliehe (2015–2019)
  Mpitsa Marai (2019)
  Thabo Senong  (2019–2021)
  Leslie Notši (2021–2022)
  Veselin Jelusic (2022–present)

Players

Current squad
The following players were selected for the friendly matches against Namibia and Ethiopia on 26 and 29 May respectively and the 2023 Africa Cup of Nations qualification matches against Comoros and Ivory Coast on 3 and June 2022 respectively.

Caps and goals correct as of 10 July 2022, after the match against Eswatini.

Recent call-ups
The following players have also been called up to the Lesotho squad within the last twelve months.

INJ Withdrew due to injury
PRE Preliminary squad / standby
RET Retired from the national team
SUS Serving suspension
WD Player withdrew from the squad due to non-injury issue.

Player records

Players in bold are still active with Lesotho.

Competitive record

FIFA World Cup

Africa Cup of Nations

COSAFA Cup

Head-to-head record
As of 26 May 2022 after match against

Kit suppliers
  Uhlsport (2000)
  Umbro (2002, 2006)
  Uhlsport (2007)
  Adidas (2008–2011)
  Basutoland Ink (2012–2019)
  Umbro (2019–)

Honours
COSAFA Cup :
 Runners-up: 2000

References

 
African national association football teams